Sara Patricia Pascoe (born 22 May 1981) is an English actress, comedian and writer. She has appeared on television programmes including 8 Out of 10 Cats Does Countdown for Channel 4, QI for BBC  and Taskmaster for the digital channel Dave.

Early life
Pascoe was born to Gail (née Newmarch) and Derek Pascoe, a musician. Her great-grandmother was Rosa Newmarch, a poet and writer on music.

Born in Dagenham, London, Pascoe was brought up in nearby Romford. Her parents divorced when she was young and she was brought up by her mother. She attended Eastbury Comprehensive School in Barking. She later attended Gaynes School in Upminster. Aged 16, Pascoe had an abortion which was detailed in her memoir, Animal: The Autobiography of a Female Body.

For a short while, Pascoe aspired to study philosophy at the University of Cambridge, motivated by both her enjoyment of the novel Sophie's World and her desire to join Footlights, the university's dramatic club. However, she read English at the University of Sussex, where she met and became friends with Cariad Lloyd. After graduation she worked as an actor and supplemented her income with temporary work, but found work "hard to come by" and declared herself bankrupt.

Career

Before her comedy career, Pascoe was a tour guide in London.

Pascoe has appeared in many television programmes and panel shows, including Stand Up for the Week, The Thick of It, Mock the Week, The Increasingly Poor Decisions of Todd Margaret, Campus, Being Human, Twenty Twelve, QI, Have I Got News For You, Would I Lie to You, Hypothetical, and W1A as well as all-female sketch show Girl Friday (part of Channel 4's Comedy Showcase), which she co-wrote.

Pascoe began performing stand up comedy in 2007. In the following year she was a runner-up in the Funny Women award in 2008 with Rachel Stubbings. Katherine Ryan won the award that year.

In August 2010, she performed her first show at the Edinburgh Festival Fringe, Sara Pascoe Vs Her Ego.

In 2012, she appeared in episode 11 of the Comedian's Comedian Podcast hosted by Stuart Goldsmith, and in Live at the Apollo. She appeared on the BBC TV panel show QI in 2013.

In 2014, she performed at the Edinburgh Festival Fringe and toured the UK for the first time with the show Sara Pascoe Vs History. The show was nominated for the Foster's Edinburgh Comedy Award 2014 for Best Comedy Show. In October 2014, she appeared in Never Mind the Buzzcocks and stood in line at the identity parade round as a former dancer and back-up singer for the entertainer (and Robbie Williams's father) Pete Conway. Also that month, she appeared on the topical panel quiz Have I Got News for You as a panellist and in one of the sketches of the Channel 4 charity night Stand Up to Cancer.

In 2015, she appeared as a panellist on two Radio 4 programmes, the  science discussion programme The Infinite Monkey Cage in February, and the comedy quiz programme The Unbelievable Truth in September.

In 2016, along with numerous other celebrities, Pascoe toured the UK to support Jeremy Corbyn's bid to become prime minister.

She has written two books. The first, Animal: The Autobiography of a Female Body, was published in 2016. Her second book, Sex Power Money, was published in 2019, which explores (mostly heterosexual) sexual relations, with particular focuses on male sexuality and on sex work. It is informed by evolutionary biology and social research, and by her own experiences and feelings. She also hosts a related podcast of the same name, in which she  interviews people who have experience around sex work, stripping and porn.

In 2016, she went on tour again with the show Animal. She participated in series 3 of the comedy challenge show, Taskmaster, which was broadcast on Dave in October and November 2016.

She has appeared in all three of Frankie Boyle's Autopsy BBC programmes (2014–2016), discussing political issues, and from 2017 until 2020 has been a regular guest on his topical series Frankie Boyle's New World Order. She also performed a half-hour stand-up set in episode 1 of series 2 of Live from the BBC in 2017.

On 27 October 2017, she appeared in an episode of the British travel documentary series Travel Man on Channel 4. In February 2018, she started a BBC Radio 4 series called Modern Monkey.

In April 2018, she appeared as a panellist in two episodes of the BBC Radio 4 panel show Just A Minute. In May 2018, she starred in a BBC comedy short entitled "Sara Pascoe vs Monogamy".

In 2019 she was announced as the host of Dave series Comedians Giving Lectures, in which comedians deliver a stand-up presentation in the guise of a lecture. In February 2020, Dave announced that they were commissioning two further series, with series 2 scheduled to be filmed and broadcast in 2020 and series 3 in 2021. However, the Covid-19 pandemic caused the project to be delayed, and both series were filmed at the National Gallery in London in summer 2021. Series 2 was broadcast in November 2021 and Series 3 in April 2022.

In March 2019, she appeared in Travelling Blind with Amar Latif on BBC2.

In April 2019, a live recording of Pascoe's LadsLadsLads tour at the London Palladium was shown on BBC Two.

In November 2020 she hosted An Evening With Yuval Noah Harari,  a livestream book launch held by How to Academy and Penguin Books.

Pascoe's six-part comedy series Out of Her Mind premiered on BBC Two in October 2020. Exploring "heartbreak, family and how to survive them", the series is loosely based on her own life, with Pascoe playing a version of herself. Co-stars include Juliet Stevenson and Cariad Lloyd.

Pascoe's three-part BBC Two series called Last Woman on Earth with Sara Pascoe premiered on 27 December 2020. In May 2022, the series was recommissioned for a second series.

She is the host of a panel show Guessable broadcast on Comedy Central UK from October 2020.

On 16 September 2021, it was announced that Pascoe would host the eighth series of The Great British Sewing Bee, replacing Joe Lycett.

Other television appearances

In 2017, Pascoe was one of four contestants on series 7, episode 8 of The Celebrity Chase, progressing to the episode's Final Chase.

Pascoe was one of the four competitors on a Christmas edition of  The Great British Sewing Bee broadcast on Boxing Day 2020 on BBC 1. Her fellow competitors were Denise Van Outen, Shirley Ballas and Ranj Singh.

Personal life
Pascoe lives in London. From 2013 to late 2016, she dated the comedian John Robins. Her reflections on that relationship and its aftermath were the basis of her 2017 show LadsLadsLads at the Edinburgh Festival Fringe. In 2020, she married fellow comedian Steen Raskopoulos. In November 2021, she announced that she was pregnant. In February 2022, Pascoe gave birth to her first child, announcing it on Valentine's Day.

References

External links
Official website

1981 births
Living people
21st-century British non-fiction writers
21st-century English comedians
21st-century English women writers
Alumni of the University of Sussex
Comedians from London
English feminists
English humanists
Sentientists
English stand-up comedians
English television actresses
English women comedians
English women non-fiction writers
People from Dagenham
Writers from London